WLKL (89.9 FM, The Max Alternative) is a radio station broadcasting an alternative music format. Licensed to Mattoon, Illinois, United States, the station serves the Mattoon/Neoga area. The station is currently owned by Lake Land College through its licensee Community College District #517.

References

External links
 
 

LKL
Coles County, Illinois
Radio stations established in 1975
1975 establishments in Illinois